Love Never Turns Against is the eighth studio album by Japanese singer/songwriter Mari Hamada, released on June 21, 1988 by Invitation. Produced by Greg Edward, it is Hamada's second album to be recorded in the U.S. It began Hamada's transition from heavy metal to a more mainstream pop rock sound, featuring collaborations with Canadian producer/musician David Foster and Chicago bassist/vocalist Jason Scheff. The album was reissued alongside Hamada's past releases on January 15, 2014.

Love Never Turns Against peaked at No. 4 on Oricon's albums chart.

Track listing

 Track 10 not included in LP release.

Personnel 
 Michael Landau – guitar
 John Pierce – bass
 Tom Keane – keyboards
 David Foster – keyboards
 Jeff Daniel – keyboards
 Greg Edward – keyboards, percussion
 John Keane – drums, percussion
 Jason Scheff – backing vocals

Charts

References

External links 
  (Mari Hamada)
  (Victor Entertainment)
 
 

1988 albums
Japanese-language albums
Mari Hamada albums
Victor Entertainment albums